Dichrostigma is a genus of snakeflies in the family Raphidiidae. There are about five described species in the genus.

Species
The following species are listed in the genus Dichrostigma:

 Dichrostigma adananum (Albarda, 1891)
 Dichrostigma flavipes (Stein, 1863)
 Dichrostigma hungaricum (Navás, 1915)
 Dichrostigma malickyi (H.Aspöck & U.Aspöck, 1964)
 Dichrostigma mehadia (H.Aspöck & U.Aspöck, 1964)

References

Raphidioptera